In the 2009 Indian general election for Gujarat were held for 26 seats in the state. The major two contenders in the state were Bharatiya Janta Party (BJP) and the Indian National Congress (INC).

Voting and Results
Source: Election Commission of India

Results by Party
The Bharatiya Janta Party (BJP) won 15 seats and the Indian National Congress won  11 seats.

List of Elected MPs

References

G
2009
2009